Orocrambus ornatus is a moth in the family Crambidae. This species is endemic to New Zealand. It is classified as critically endangered by the Department of Conservation.

Taxonomy 
O. ornatus was first described by Alfred Philpott in 1927 using a male specimen he collected in Golden Downs on 8 January 1926. Philpott named the species Crambus ornatus. George Vernon Hudson described and illustrated the species under the same name in 1939.  In 1975 David Edward Gaskin assigned Crambus ornatus to the genus Orocrambus.

Description 
Philpott described the species as follows:

Distribution 
This species is endemic to New Zealand and has been recorded in Golden Downs in the Tasman District as well as in the Nelson district.

Ecology and habitat 
O. ornatus appears to prefer forest habitat. Adults have been recorded on wing in January.

Host plants 
This species has been found to be associated with plants in the genus Uncinia.

Conservation Status 
This species has the "Nationally Critical" conservation status under the New Zealand Threat Classification System.

References

Crambinae
Moths described in 1927
Moths of New Zealand
Endemic fauna of New Zealand
Endangered biota of New Zealand
Endemic moths of New Zealand